Desmostachya bipinnata, commonly known as halfa grass, big cordgrass, and salt reed-grass, is an Old World perennial grass, long known and used in human history. The grass is tall, tufted, leafy, perennial grass, branching from the base, erect from a stout creeping rootstock.

Distribution
Desmostachya bipinnata is native to northeast and west tropical, and northern Africa (in Algeria, Chad, Egypt, Eritrea, Ethiopia, Libya, Mauritania, Somalia, Sudan, Tunisia); and countries in the Middle East, and temperate and tropical Asia (in Afghanistan, China, India, Iran, Iraq, Israel, Myanmar, Nepal, Pakistan, Saudi Arabia, Thailand).

In agriculture, Desmostachya bipinnata is a weed commonly found in wheat crops.

Taxonomy 
On the basis of distinct morphological and reproductive characters, four new subspecies of D. bipinnata have been described by Pandeya and Pandeya (2002). However, it is uncertain whether these subspecies represent actual genetic differences, the authors also note the existence of different biotypes occurring in response to soil and climatic conditions in western India. The four subspecies proposed are: 
D. bipinnata longispiculata;
D. bipinnata jodhpurensis;
D. bipinnata sheelai;
D. bipinnata agraensis.

Religious significance

Desmostachya bipinnata has long been used in various traditions (Hindus, Jains and Buddhists) as a very sacred plant. According to early Buddhist accounts, it was the material used by Buddha for his meditation seat when he attained enlightenment. It is mentioned in the Rig Veda for use in sacred ceremonies and also as a seat for priests and the gods. Kusha grass is specifically recommended by Krishna in the Bhagavad Gita as part of the ideal seat for meditation.

Other
In folk medicine, Desmostachya bipinnata has been used to treat dysentery and menorrhagia, and as a diuretic.

In arid regions, Desmostachya bipinnata is used as fodder for livestock.

References

Plants described in 1759
Flora of Africa
Flora of China
Flora of Western Asia
Flora of tropical Asia
Flora of Saudi Arabia
Fodder
Chloridoideae